The Dundalk Tournament  was a late Victorian era Irish grass court tennis tournament organised by the Dundalk Tennis Club, and played at the cricket field of the Dundalk Grammar School, Dundalk, County Louth, Ireland. from 1881 to 1884.

History
The Dundalk Tournament was an late 19th century tennis event first staged in late July 1881, at the cricket field of the Dundalk Grammar School, Dundalk, County Louth, Ireland. The first recorded winner of the men's singles was Ireland's Robert Shaw Templer. The final known edition was in 1884.

Finals

Mens Singles
(Incomplete roll)
 1881— Robert Shaw Templer def.  Kerry Leyne Supple,  2 sets to 1.

References

1881 establishments in Ireland
Defunct tennis tournaments in the United Kingdom
Grass court tennis tournaments